Simon Clive Barbon Greatwich (born 30 September 1988) is a Filipino international footballer who plays for Maharlika Manila, as a central midfielder.

Early and personal life 
Born in Brighton on 30 September 1988, Greatwich is the younger brother of fellow players Christopher Greatwich and Phil Greatwich, and was born to an English father and a Filipina mother who is originally from Davao.

Career

Club career
After playing youth football with Brighton & Hove Albion, Greatwich spent his early senior career in English non-league football with Burgess Hill Town and Ringmer, before moving to the United States in 2009 to play college soccer with the Hartwick Hawks.

In early January 2012, Greatwich signed with Filipino side Loyola Meralco Sparks in time for the 2011-12 United Football League season.

He make his debut for the Sparks on 18 May 2012 against Geylang United FC for the 2012 Singapore Cup. His club was renamed as F.C. Meralco Manila when it joined the inaugural season of the Philippines Football League in 2017 which is the last time the club played in a league before its dissolution in January 2018. In 2020, during the COVID-19 pandemic, it was announced that he would play as a central midfielder for newly formed club Maharlika.

International career
Greatwich made his international debut for the Philippines on 17 October 2008 in the 2008 AFF Suzuki Cup qualification tournament.

International goals
Scores and results list the Philippines' goal tally first.

Honours

Club

Loyola
UFL Cup: 2013; Third 2012

References

External links 

1989 births
Living people
Filipino British sportspeople
British Asian footballers
English people of Filipino descent
Filipino footballers
Citizens of the Philippines through descent
Filipino expatriate footballers
Philippines international footballers
Brighton & Hove Albion F.C. players
Burgess Hill Town F.C. players
Hartwick Hawks men's soccer players
Ringmer F.C. players
F.C. Meralco Manila players
Association football midfielders
Maharlika F.C. players